Ogustus or Martalanus Bastiansz, better known as Wally Bastiansz (Sinhala: වොලී බැස්ටියන්ස්) (died January 10, 1985) was a Sri Lankan singer who developed the style of chorus baila in the 1940s.

Biography

Bastianz was a police officer attached to the traffic division. He was also an experienced guitarist, banjo player, and violinist. Drawing from his orchestral roots, he transformed the tunes of standards like "The Battle Hymn of the Republic" and "Mademoiselle from Armentières (Hinky Dinky Parlez Vous)" into classic baila songs. He is also known as the King of Sri Lankan Baila Songs. 

There has always been some controversy over his name "Wally". It is very customary in Sri Lanka, even today, for children to have nicknames. Although he was baptized Ogustus Martalanus after his grandfather Wilhelmus Martalanus, in the family, amongst close relatives, and even amongst his old neighbors, Ogustus was only known as either "Olie, or Olinton". Young Ogustus was not very comfortable with his name and mostly went by his initials O.M. Bastiansz rather than Ogustus or Martalanus. After embarking on his musical adventure he aptly adapted his nickname "Olie" to be "Wally", his well-known stage name, and, for all official purposes, presented himself as Olinton Mervin Bastianz, maintaining his original initials O.M.

His songs dealt with everyday life and simple people. One of his hits ('Nurse Nona') was an ode to a nurse in a hospital and another covered the trial of jilted lover Eric Bacho. He sang several songs in English. Other songs were written by him, but later ascribed to other popular artists include Hai Hooi Babi Achchige, Yaman Bando Vesak Balanna, Ratak Watinawa, Le Kiri Karala, Irene Josephine, Kussi Amma Sera, Muhudey Yamu Masun Genenna, Weeriyen Soya, Nondi Simaiyya, Wada Kaha Sudiya, and many others.

Family

It is almost an unknown fact that the nurse in his all-time favourite song "Nurse Nona" was none other than his own late sister, Felicia Florence Jayasekera (née Bastianz, died 1996) who worked as a nurse in the early 1940s. Florence gave up her nursing career in 1944 after her first child was born. In 1969 Florence and her family moved to the ancestral home of the Bastiansz family in Piyadigama, a small village about 2 km north of the coast between Galle and Gintota, to take care of their ailing father Hinton Wilmot Bastiansz.

The old Bastiansz residence in Piyadigama, where Wally Bastiansz and all his eight siblings were born, is now occupied by one of Florence's sons.

Wally Bastiansz is closely related to Sri Lankan popular artist's Kanthie & Judy de Silva. Wally was Kanthie's (Judy's mother) father Edgar de Silva's first cousin. Wally's Father Hinton Wilmot and Edgar's mother Winifred were siblings.

Discography

 Sada Sulan Hamanne

 Hai Hui Babi Achchige

 Irin Josapin Rosalin

 Nondi Simayiya

 Kussi Amma Sera

 Muhude Yamu Masunmaranna

 Nonaa Mage Nurse Nonaa

 Yaman Bando Vesak Balanba

 Wadakaha Suliya 

 Mata Ennaba Nana Mama Ennenaa

 Ratak Watinawa Api Maupiyo denna

 Mathakai Amme Ode Darunalawilla (Le Kiri Karala)

 Dadikala Mage Mauni

 Weeriyen Soya Apa Rakshakala Piya

 Dawasak Amma

 Seeyage Barabaage

 Kusa Raju Kawum Muhunathin (Aale)

 Kusa Raju Kawum

 Puruwe Pinakina

 Rata Wanasana (Kelam)

 Ruwata Hadata Penunoth

 Sirilak Diwayina

 Yanne Oba Koibada

 Suranganawiye

 Aale Aale

 Wadaka Bariya

 Duppath Mawu Kenek

 Govi Palpatha

 Waduwa

 Girawada Giraweeda

 Ranwan Karal

 Modaya

 Dutusihinaya

 Banjo Raban

 Ape Seeya

 Wena Saththu

 Kanabona podi kosata meeyek

 Sooda madiwela Arakku soor wediwela

 Api dannawa malli 

 Watapita bohoma denek sitinne

 Wareln Machang Salli Athitharam

 Goviya

 Yanne Oba Koyibada

 Mithura Kiuwama

References

Burgher musicians
20th-century Sri Lankan male singers
1985 deaths
1914 births